Rock fever and island fever are colloquial terms for a form of mental distress said to mainly inflict mainlanders who move to isolated islands, especially any of the Hawaiian islands or Guam. It is not a medical term or classification and has not been the focus of any serious research. It has been described as "an ailment" of feeling "stifled by [the island's] size and isolation", making its sufferers "anxious, irritated, desperate, and claustrophobic." It is often ascribed to homesickness. Rock fever has also been described as a feeling of isolation that could arise in any isolated place and inflict anyone, including native inhabitants.

See also 

 Winter-over syndrome

References

Emotions
Living arrangements
Mental disorders
Health in Guam
Health in Hawaii